Karilee Fuglum (born 1960) is a Canadian artist. 

Her work is included in the collections of the Musée national des beaux-arts du Québec and the National Gallery of Canada.

References

Living people
1960 births
20th-century Canadian women artists
21st-century Canadian women artists